Pine Center is an unincorporated community in Roosevelt Township, Crow Wing County, Minnesota, United States. The community is located near the junction of Crow Wing County Roads 2 and 8. Nearby places include Brainerd, Garrison, Hillman, and Vineland.

References

Unincorporated communities in Crow Wing County, Minnesota
Unincorporated communities in Minnesota